Tedeschi is a surname, derived from an Italian word for "German". Notable people with the name include:

Art Tedeschi, drummer of The Frustrators
Carla Gilberta Bruni Tedeschi (born 1967), known as Carla Bruni, Italian songwriter, singer, model, wife of Nicolas Sarkozy
Enzo Tedeschi (born 1976), Australian film producer
Ettore Gotti Tedeschi (born 1945), Italian economist and banker
Gad Tedeschi, Israeli jurist
Giacomo Radini-Tedeschi (1857–1914), Catholic bishop
Gianrico Tedeschi (1920–2020), Italian film actor
Luca Tedeschi (born 1987), Italian footballer
Mark Tedeschi (born 1952), Australian barrister and photographer, father of Simon Tedeschi
Marzia Tedeschi (born 1976), Italian actress
Mirko Tedeschi (cyclist, born 1987), Italian cyclist
Mirko Tedeschi (cyclist, born 1989), Italian cyclist
Nadir Tedeschi (1930–2021), Italian politician
Simon Tedeschi (born 1981), Australian classical pianist, son of Mark Tedeschi
Susan Tedeschi, American blues and soul musician
Tedeschi Trucks Band, a band led by Susan Tedeschi and Derek Trucks
Tony Tedeschi, American pornographic movie actor
Valeria Bruni Tedeschi, Italian-French actress, sister of Carla Bruni

See also
 Tedesco (surname)

Italian-language surnames
Ethnonymic surnames